XEMS-AM was a radio station that served the Brownsville, Texas (United States) / Matamoros, Tamaulipas (Mexico) border area. The last brand that the station carried was Radio Mexicana with a Regional Mexican format.

History
XEMS began broadcasting on 1500 kHz in 1952. It soon moved to 1490 AM.

On March 10, 2021, the Federal Telecommunications Institute (IFT) denied an application for the renewal of XEMS-AM's concession. The station had failed to pay three of the nine installments of its last renewal, in addition to failure to file two annual reports or pay for its studio–transmitter link frequency. XEMS had been mired in ownership problems which involved the ownership of Antonio Gallegos Escalante's estate among two women with whom he had children.

References

Defunct radio stations in Mexico
1952 establishments in Mexico
Radio stations in Matamoros, Tamaulipas
Radio stations established in 1952
Radio stations disestablished in 2021
Spanish-language radio stations